Šime is a masculine Croatian given name. Notable people with the name include:

Šime Budinić (1535–1600), a 16th-century Catholic priest and writer from Zadar, Venetian Dalmatia (today Croatia)
Šime Ljubić (1822–1896), Croatian historian
Šime Đodan (1927–2007), Croatian politician and economist
Šime Luketin (born 1953), Croatian footballer
Šime Vrsaljko (born 1992), Croatian footballer

See also
 Šimun, of which Šime can be a diminutive form
 Šimić

Croatian masculine given names